Nina Valentinovna Anisimova (born February 26, 1973) is a Russian triathlete. She was born in Saint Petersburg.

Anisimova competed in the first Olympic triathlon at the 2000 Summer Olympics. She took twelfth place with a total time of 2:03:26.35. At the 2004 Summer Olympics, she did not finish the competition.

References
 Profile

External links

1973 births
Living people
Russian female triathletes
Triathletes at the 2000 Summer Olympics
Triathletes at the 2004 Summer Olympics
Olympic triathletes of Russia
Sportspeople from Saint Petersburg